Horst Fischer (8 June 1930 – 21 March 1986) was a German trumpeter.

Career
Fischer was born in Oberhermersdorf. In the early 1950s, he was a member of Erwin Lehn's radio dance orchestra in Stuttgart. Especially his tours with Werner Müller were very successful. From 1971 he was under contract with the Radio orchester in Zürich.
According to the American magazine Down Beat he was among the world's top trumpet players in the 1950s.  He died, aged 55, in Cologne.

Album discography 

 Horst Fischer, Werner Müller Und Sein Orchester – Yesterday Hits For Dancing
 Mitternachts Blues
 Magic Trumpet
 Horst Fischer And His Golden Trumpet – Orchester Hans Bertram – Horst Fischer And His Golden Trumpet (LP)
 Ronny King – Horst Fischer – Ferenc Aszodi – Just Zinner – Roy Etzel – Sentimental Trumpet (2xLP)
 Golden Trumpet Golden Hits
 Bea Abrecht

References

1930 births
1986 deaths
Easy listening musicians
trumpet
trumpet
20th-century German musicians
20th-century trumpeters
20th-century German male musicians